Rostislav Vladimirovich (died 1066) was a landless prince (izgoi) from the Rurikid dynasty of Kievan Rus’. He was baptized as Mikhail. According to the Russian genealogist Nikolai Baumgarten, the mother of Rostislav was Oda of Stade, a daughter of the Stade Count Leopold. That claim is also supported by other historians.

At his younger age, Rostyslav ruled Rostov in the land of the Merya. His father Vladimir of Novgorod was the eldest son of Yaroslav I of Kiev. If Vladimir had not predeceased his father, he would have succeeded to the Kievan throne. Under the East Slavic house law, the early death of Rostislav's father made his descendants forfeit all claims to Kiev.

For five years after his father's death, Rostislav who was about 14 years old had no appanage. Finally, his uncles gave him Volhynia and Halych, where he stayed from 1057 and 1064, guarding the western frontier of the Rus' lands. According to Vasily Tatischev, it was there that he married Anna Lanke, the daughter of King Béla I of Hungary. Rostislav did not like the distant and meager land and, in 1064, assisted by his father's close friend Vyshata, seized the rich Tmutarakan on the Black Sea littoral, previously controlled by the House of Chernigov.

His predecessor, Gleb Svyatoslavich, escaped to his father, Svyatoslav II of Chernigov who was part of the Yaroslaviches triumvirate. The latter approached Tmutarakan with his army and Rostislav was forced to leave the city. Once Svyatoslav returned to Chernigov, Rostislav expelled Gleb once again from Tmutarakan and entered the city in triumph. During his brief rule, he subdued the local Circassians (also known as Kasogi) and other indigenous tribes. His success provoked the rivalry of neighboring Greek Chersonesos in Crimean peninsula, whose envoy poisoned him on 3 February 1066.

References

External links
Profile at hrono.ru 

1030s births
1066 deaths
11th-century princes in Kievan Rus'
Princes of Volhynia
Rurikids
Rostislavichi family